"He Was There (When I Needed You)" is a song written by Sue Richards, and recorded by American country music artist Tammy Wynette. It was released in March 1980 as the first single from the album Only Lonely Sometimes.

Background and reception
"He Was There (When I Needed You)" was recorded in January 1980 at the Columbia Recording Studio in Nashville, Tennessee. The session featured tracks that would later appear on Wynette's 1980 album. The recording session was produced by Billy Sherrill and included renowned Nashville session musicians such as Johnny Gimble, Pete Drake and George Richey (Wynette's husband).

The song reached number 17 on the Billboard Hot Country Singles chart. It released on her 1980 studio album Only Lonely Sometimes.

Track listing
7" vinyl single
 "He Was There (When I Needed You)" – 3:15
 "Only the Names Have Been Changed" – 3:11

Charts

References 

1980 songs
1980 singles
Tammy Wynette songs
Song recordings produced by Billy Sherrill
Epic Records singles